Road to the Lemon Grove is a Canadian comedy-drama film, directed by Dale Hildebrand and released in 2018.

Plot

The film stars Charly Chiarelli in a dual role as Antonio Contatini, an elderly man who has died but is stuck in limbo as his earthly mission is not yet completed, and Calogero Contatini, Antonio's son who is part of the family feud that is preventing Antonio's admission to heaven. Calogero is undertaking a road trip to scatter Antonio's ashes at the family-owned lemon grove in Racalmuto; however, his brother Vincenzo (Burt Young) wants to sell the grove to the developers of an amusement park, and dispatches Guido (Nick Mancuso) to try to stop Calogero. The film's cast also includes Loreena McKennitt as the voice of God.

Release

The film premiered at Toronto's Italian Contemporary Film Festival in 2018, before going into commercial release in August 2019.

Awards
Steven Sangster received a Canadian Screen Award nomination for Best Visual Effects at the 8th Canadian Screen Awards in 2020.

References

External links

2018 films
Canadian road comedy-drama films
English-language Canadian films
Films set in Italy
Works about Italian-Canadian culture
2010s road comedy-drama films
Limbo
Films about the afterlife
2010s English-language films
2010s Canadian films